Sonu Khadka (born 14 September 1994) is a Nepalese cricketer who plays for the Nepal women's national cricket team.

Playing career 
On 14 January 2019, She made her Twenty20 International debut against UAE women's in the Thailand Women's T20 Smash. She  represented Nepal in the 2019 ICC Women's Qualifier Asia in Bangkok, Thailand. This tournament was the part of Asia region qualifier for the 2019 ICC Women's World Twenty20 Qualifier as well as the 2020 Women's Cricket World Cup Qualifier tournaments, with the top team progressing to both of them.

References

External links 
 

1994 births
Living people
Nepalese women cricketers
Nepal women Twenty20 International cricketers
Cricketers at the 2014 Asian Games
South Asian Games bronze medalists for Nepal
South Asian Games medalists in cricket